Grecian foxglove is a common name for several plants and may refer to:

Digitalis laevigata
Digitalis lanata